Club de Fútbol Cafetaleros de Chiapas is a Mexican football club based in the city of Tuxtla Gutiérrez, Chiapas currently competing in Liga Premier de México, the  third tier of Mexican football. Between 2015 and 2020, the team played at Ascenso MX, the second tier of Mexican football. On June 26, 2020, the club's first-team squad was relocated to Cancún and renamed as Cancún F.C., however, Cafetaleros de Chiapas kept the team registered in Liga Premier, which was affiliated with Cancún F.C. between 2020 and 2022.

History
Cafetaleros de Tapachula Futbol Club was founded on May 25, 2015 after Altamira based Estudiantes de Altamira announced the relocation of the club to Tapachula due to economic reasons.
On June 7, 2015, the club's relocation to Tapachula was made official by Ascenso MX.

The team won the 2018 Ascenso MX, but were not promoted to the Liga MX because they did not meet regulations.

On May 28, 2019 the team was moved to Tuxtla Gutiérrez and was renamed as Cafetaleros de Chiapas. The team was relocated to meet the requirements required to promote to the Liga MX. Also, the team changed its colors, originally green and black to gold and black.

Uniforms

Past kits 
 2021-2022

 2020-2021

 2019-2020

 2018-2019

 2017-2018

 2016-2017

 2015-2016

Stadium

Cafetaleros de Chiapas play their home matches at the Estadio Víctor Manuel Reyna in Tuxtla Gutiérrez, Chiapas. The stadium capacity is 29,001 people. Its owned by Government of Chiapas, and its surface is covered by natural grass. The stadium was opened in early 1982.

Formerly, Cafetaleros played their home matches at the Estadio Olímpico de Tapachula in Tapachula, Chiapas.

Personnel

Coaching staff

Players

First-team squad

Managers
 Carlos de los Cobos (2015)
 Gabriel Caballero (2015–2016)
 Mauro Camoranesi (2016–2017)
 Paco Ramírez (2017)
 Gabriel Caballero (2017–2018)
 Irving Rubirosa (2018)
 Diego de la Torre (2018)
 Luis Fernando Soto (2019)
 Gabriel Pereyra (2019)
 Diego de la Torre (2019–2020)
 Leonardo Casanova (2020)
 Miguel Ángel Casanova (2020–2022)
 Jesús Palacios (2023–)

Honours
 Ascenso MX
 Winners: Clausura 2018
 Campeón de Ascenso
 Winners: 2017–18

References

External links

Ascenso MX teams
Football clubs in Chiapas